Pasiphila erratica is a moth in the family Geometridae. It is endemic to New Zealand. Specimens were first collected at Bold Peak, in the Humboldt Ranges and the Hunter Mountains in the South Island.

References

External links

Moths described in 1916
erratica
Moths of New Zealand
Endemic fauna of New Zealand
Endemic moths of New Zealand